K31 may refer to:
 K31, a Swiss rifle
 K-31 (Kansas highway)
 , a corvette of the Royal Navy
 , a corvette of the Swedish Navy
 Potassium-31, an isotope of potassium
 
 Sonata in B-flat, K. 31, by Wolfgang Amadeus Mozart